The Washington Black Senators were a Negro league baseball team based in Washington, DC. When the Washington Elite Giants moved to Baltimore, MD in 1938, the gap was filled in by the Black Senators. They were just 2–13 in the Negro National League. Managed by Ben Taylor, the club had two .300 hitters – 3B Henry Spearman (.340) and OF Buddy Burbage (.313).

See also 
 Washington Black Senators players

References 
 The Biographical Encyclopedia of the Negro Baseball Leagues by James Riley
 The Complete Book of Baseball's Negro Leagues by John Holway

External links
 Franchise history at Seamheads.com

African-American history of Washington, D.C.
Negro league baseball teams
Defunct baseball teams in Washington, D.C.
Baseball teams disestablished in 1938
Baseball teams established in 1938